Geri's Game is a 1997 American computer-animated short film produced by Pixar and written and directed by Jan Pinkava. The short, which shows a senior named Geri who competes with himself in a game of chess, was Pixar's first film to feature a human being as its main character; Geri later made a cameo appearance in Toy Story 2 as "The Cleaner", here voiced by Jonathan Harris instead of Bob Peterson.

Geri's Game was released eight years after Knick Knack, the last short by Pixar to that point, made as part of an effort to reignite the studio's short film series, which had been put on standby in order to focus on the creation of television commercials as well as the studio's first feature film, which would become the first-ever full-length computer-animated film, Toy Story. A dedicated research and development team worked alongside the filmmakers to devise ways to get around the burdens of animating a human character, leading to an in-house computer simulation to mimic the natural movement of clothing on a character. Subdivision surface modeling, a technique partly pioneered by Edwin Catmull in 1978 but mostly ignored in favor of NURBS surfaces, was used to bestow natural movement and realistic skin textures on the human character himself.

Geri's Game premiered on November 24, 1997, winning an Academy Award for Best Animated Short Film the following year. It was later shown with the theatrical release of Pixar's second feature film, A Bug's Life, the following year, and therefore became part of a Pixar tradition of pairing shorts with feature films.

Plot
In an empty central park, the title character, Geri, blows the leaves off a table and sets up a chessboard. He proceeds to play a chess game against himself, playing the parts of both participants by moving to opposite sides of the board and either removing or replacing his glasses. The "player" without the glasses and playing as black, is aggressive and confident, while the "player" with the glasses who plays white is timid and makes several mistakes. The confident player soon captures all the timid player's pieces except the King - the timid player fakes a heart attack and falls to the ground, startling the other, who quickly starts to take his own pulse. The timid player surreptitiously turns the board around, so the confident player has only the King left, and he has nearly all his pieces. He then gets up and tells the confident player he is all right and takes his turn. The confident player, confused and upset, knocks down his king and concedes defeat and gives the timid player the prize - his false teeth. The camera pans back to remind the audience only one person was playing the game the entire time.

Development
Geri's Game was Pixar's first original short film since 1989, when Knick Knack was released. It was directed and written by Jan Pinkava, who joined the studio in 1993 to work on their TV commercials while the other directors and writers were preoccupied with the production of Toy Story, and had been continuously approaching executive producer Darla K. Anderson with the proposal that the studio make a new short film.

Initial conception 
Work on the short began shortly after the release of Toy Story and during early production of A Bug's Life, when Ed Catmull decided that the studio should resurrect its short films production as a way to not only bring new animators and storytellers into Pixar, but also as a way to further push research and development for the studio. For the first of these shorts, which would be the first one made in 8 years, Catmull wanted Pixar to create a story which featured a human as its central protagonist. Upon Anderson's suggestion, he reached out to Pinkava to direct the short. According to Pinkava himself, Catmull said he could direct the short as long as it starred a human character and had a serviceable story behind it.

When trying to brainstorm a concept, Pinkava asked himself if he would be able to come up with a story that featured only one character, which would both give it an artistic edge and make development easier on the technical side of things, as coming up with just a single stylized, but credible, human character was hard enough. He designed an elderly character  belonging to the polar opposite age sector of Billy, the infant character in Tin Toy, and one of Pixar's earliest attempts at creating a human character. He felt it would be interesting to animate a character with the body language of an old man, similar to how Billy was animated with the gesticulations of a baby.

Story evolution 
After spending time storyboarding and brainstorming ideas, Pinkava came up with 3 different concepts starring an elderly male character; one of these concepts was about him playfully riding up and down an elevator, while another one involved him playing a game of chess against himself. The latter idea was inspired by Pinkava and his elderly relatives' love of chess—particularly his grandfather, an avid chess player who would often play rounds of the game with only himself.

Pinkava pitched an early animatic version of the chess story, and was turned down and given a second chance to restart and further develop the story. After giving a second pitch with a more structured plot, the project was green-lit and Karen Dufilho was issued to produce the project.

Pinkava, who grew up in Czechoslovakia, was inspired by the works of Czech filmmaker and storywriter Jiří Trnka, particularly his stop motion puppet films; Trnka's characters, usually human ones, were marionette puppets that had vastly stylized body and facial features, which Pinkava similarly applied somewhat to Geri's character design, with facial attributes such as his nose and chin. Pinkava did several maquettes of different designs for Geri before settling on his final appearance, which he then sculpted into a (3D) clay model that was baked by Jerome Ranft and digitally scanned into Pixar's animation software. (Ranft initially was the clay sculptor for the character, working on his head and hands, but after receiving continuous suggestions on how to tweak the model, he reportedly handed the sculpting utensil to Pinkava, simply telling him, "You do it," while smiling.)

Technology 
Geri's voice (vocal intonations) came from Pixar writer Bob Peterson. Peterson wanted Pixar to be able to create a short that could technologically push the studio to new heights; specifically, he wanted Pixar to create a short film featuring a character that could display both convincing-looking skin and realistic cloth animation. The first Pixar short film with a human main character, Geri's Game was produced with the goal of "[taking] human and cloth animation to new heights". To achieve the goal of producing a believable 3D human character, two people were brought on to do research for the project: Michael Kass, who did the calculations behind the physics for a dynamic cloth system, and Tony DeRose, who made use of subdivision surfaces, a technique invented by Catmull in conjunction with Silicon Graphics founder Jim Clark, which allowed for more lifelike skin surfaces.

Previously, most 3D character surfaces were crafted using several non-uniform rational B-splines (NURBS) that had to be "stitched" together, which made for less expressive movement and caused models to frequently tear. The use of subdivision surfacing, which renders a character's skin as one large surface, allowed for smoother object movement, as well as more intricate detail. DeRose had been working on the technology at the University of Washington, and had already brought subdivision surfaces to CAD makers, who were ultimately unconvinced, and held their faith in NURBS, before bringing it to Pixar, which was much more receptive.

On the clothing side, after toiling endlessly, Kass managed to create a system which could emulate/simulate the movement of cloth, at which point the team realized that the suit jacket they had modeled didn't fit with Geri's movement outside of a default T-pose. According to Pinkava, Steve Jobs, upon a hearing about the issue, had offered to help him by enlisting tailor Giorgio Armani to help them design an outfit for Geri, which he ultimately declined. The development of a dynamic cloth simulator made several changes to the way that animators work; for instance, the animation, when completed, needed to be sent to the simulator, which would automatically insert Geri's jacket and calculate its movements, rather than being directly sourced to the renderer after being finished. Geri also needed to be animated 30 frames in advance in order to get the simulation going, and animators couldn't "cheat" by having off-camera body parts go unanimated, as it would affect how the simulating program moved the clothing.

Like other Pixar shorts, Geri's Game contains no spoken dialogue, and so is driven only by the actions and expressions of its main character. To further push the ability to convey the film's story, extra detail was put into Geri's facial rigging compared to previous rigging methods, with rigger Paul Aichele giving the character hundreds of face controls for animators to use. These new, more detailed rigging methods went on to be used in A Bug's Life, which was being worked on at the same time.

Staff 
Like previous short films made by Pixar, Geri's Game was made by a temporary branch of Pixar employees, and was separate from the people working on the studio's feature films. It took roughly a year to produce, according to Pinkava, largely due to the amount of time allotted to developing the cloth simulation. While the short was being made, most of Pixar Studios was preoccupied with making A Bug's Life. Despite this, there were 18 different animators that worked on the project (including Pixar storywriter Pete Docter, who contributed a few scenes out of sheer interest). Despite being preoccupied directing A Bug's Life, John Lasseter suggested adding a scene in which Geri checks to make sure he's alright after seeing his alter ego stage a heart attack and keel over; Lasseter physically staged out the entire scene to Pinkava.

Release
Geri's Game premiered on November 24, 1997 at Laemmle's Monica Theater in Santa Monica, California. It was also attached to the theatrical release of Pixar's second feature film, A Bug's Life, in 1998, and subsequently featured on that film's VHS and DVD releases.

Awards

1998
 Academy Award – Best Animated Short Film
 Anima Mundi Animation Festival – Best Film x2
 Annecy International Animated Film Festival – Jan Pinkava 
 Annie Award – Outstanding Achievement in an Animated Short Subject
 Florida Film Festival – Best Short
 World Animation Celebration – Best 3-D CGI by Professional Jan Pinkava 
 Zagreb World Festival of Animated Films – Internet Favourite

References

External links
  from Pixar
 
 
 
 

1997 computer-animated films
1997 short films
1997 in chess
Animated films without speech
Animated films set in New York City
Best Animated Short Academy Award winners
Best Animated Short Subject Annie Award winners
Films about chess
Films about old age
Pixar short films
Toy Story characters
1990s Disney animated short films
American animated short films